is a Japanese-only action RPG developed by Culture Brain. It is the second SNES Super Chinese game, being a sequel to Super Ninja Boy, which was released in North America.

Contrary to its predecessor, it doesn't feature any traditional turn-based battles, but a couple of platforming sections still remain. Jack and Ryu are now travelling between different planets to defeat some alien invaders, who kidnapped the world leaders. The battle system was also greatly improved. Jack and Ryu now have a lot of new attacks and even a few different skills (although they still share levels and items), they can turn into giant ninjas in order to cast the most advanced spells and it is possible to use weapons or spells without going to the menu.
A fighting mode has also been added, allowing to play with many other characters than the heroes.

External links

Role-playing video games
Super Chinese
Super Nintendo Entertainment System games
Super Nintendo Entertainment System-only games
Japan-exclusive video games
Multiplayer and single-player video games
Action role-playing video games
1993 video games
Video games developed in Japan